In English, fritanga refers to a restaurant that makes home-style Nicaraguan foods. The staple foods at a fritanga may include gallo pinto (rice and beans), arroz blanco (white rice), carne asada (grilled meat), tajada frita (fried sliced green plantain), platano frito (fried ripe plantain), maduros (sweet plantain), yuca, queso frito (fried cheese), tortilla and cabbage salad.  Fritangas also carry daily specials such as salpicón, carne desmenuzada (shredded beef), and enchiladas, as well as speciality drinks and desserts/pastries. Fritangas have a cafeteria (comideria) style of ordering and the food can be taken out or consumed at the establishment.

In Spanish, fritanga does not refer to Nicaraguan restaurants, but to fried food in general, or a set of fried foods. Unlike frituras or fritos (same meaning), the term fritanga can have a pejorative sense, as it is an excessively greasy food, with too much oil or unhealthy. The Colombian fritanga, for example, combines different typical components such as morcilla (blood sausage), chorizo (sausage), chicharrón (pork belly), longaniza, chunchullo, maduros (plantains), papa criolla (small yellow potatoes), and arepas.

References

External links

 Picture of Colombian Fritanga
 Fritanga recipe, from "My Colombian Recipes"

Restaurants in Nicaragua
Nicaraguan cuisine